Statistics of Copenhagen Football Championship in the 1908/1909 season.

Overview
It was contested by 6 teams, and Boldklubben af 1893 won the championship.

League standings

References
Denmark - List of final tables (RSSSF)

1908–09 in Danish football
Top level Danish football league seasons
Copenhagen Football Championship seasons
Denmark